Dan A. Surra (born June 19, 1953) is a Democratic politician who represented the 75th District in the Pennsylvania House of Representatives from 1991 to 2008. He served as Majority Caucus Administrator.  He was defeated for re-election in 2008 by Republican Matt Gabler.

References

External links
Pennsylvania House of Representatives - Dan A. Surra official PA House website
 official Party website
Biography, voting record, and interest group ratings at Project Vote Smart
Follow the Money - Dan A. Surra
2006 2004 2002 2000 1998 campaign contributions

Members of the Pennsylvania House of Representatives
1953 births
Living people
People from Ridgway, Pennsylvania